Tonny de Jong (born 17 July 1974) is a former Dutch speed skater, who was raised in Heerenveen and now lives in Calgary with Canadian speed skater Mark Knoll, whom she married in 2003.

She won three Dutch Allround Championships and numerous gold medals on the 3000 m and the 5000 m at the Dutch Single Distance Championships. In 1997 and 1999 she became European Allround Champion. De Jong was the first skater who mastered the clap skate.

At the 2002 Winter Olympics she had little success, but she did appear in a nude pictorial in the March issue of the Dutch Playboy. After the following World Allround Championships she ended her speedskating career.

Medals 
An overview of medals won by de Jong at important championships she participated in, listing the years in which she won each:

Personal records 
To put these personal records in perspective, the last column (WR) lists the official world records on the dates that de Jong skated her personal records.

De Jong has an Adelskalender score of 160.231. Her highest ranking on the Adelskalender was a 3rd place.

References

External links 
Photos of Tonny de Jong
Tonny de Jong at SkateResults.com
Personal records from Jakub Majerski's Speedskating Database
The Adelskalender pages maintained by Evert Stenlund

1974 births
Living people
Dutch female speed skaters
Dutch emigrants to Canada
Speed skaters at the 1994 Winter Olympics
Speed skaters at the 1998 Winter Olympics
Speed skaters at the 2002 Winter Olympics
Olympic speed skaters of the Netherlands
Sportspeople from Friesland
People from Skarsterlân
2000s Playboy Playmates
World Allround Speed Skating Championships medalists
20th-century Dutch women
21st-century Dutch women